Flight 843 may refer to

Pan Am Flight 843, uncontained engine failure on 28 June 1965
TWA Flight 843, crashed on 30 July 1992
EgyptAir Flight 843, crashed on 7 May 2002

0843